Freja Fjord is a fjord in Peary Land, far northern Greenland. 

The fjord is mentioned in a letter from geologist Peter Dawes to Eigil Knuth regarding a possible archaeological discovery.

Geography
Larger Frigg Fjord has its mouth in the facing side.

Flowing from the Nordkrone, the small Balder Glacier discharges at the head of Freja Fjord. Mount Wistar, the highest mountain in the area, rises to the southwest of the western shore of the fjord.

See also
List of fjords of Greenland

References

External links
Greenland. Freja Fjord

Frederick E. Hyde Fjord